Amelia Gething (born 24 January 1999) is an English actress and writer. She is best known for writing and starring in the BBC show The Amelia Gething Complex, and her roles as Anne Brontë in the biographical film Emily (2022) and Ursula Pole in the Starz historical drama The Spanish Princess (2020).

Early life
Gething participated in school productions from a young age. She planned to study Psychology at university, but made the decision to leave her sixth form college in Barking early before completing her A Levels when her career began to take off.

Career 
Gething first began performing as a comedy artist and content creator on social media in 2016, writing and performing sketches to over 7 million followers across YouTube and Musical.ly (later TikTok). She was approached by the BBC in mid-2018 and invited to create a female-led comedy sketch show, which eventually became The Amelia Gething Complex.

The first season of The Amelia Gething Complex was released in October 2019, with a second season commissioned by the BBC released in March 2021. In total, there have been 18 episodes over the course of two seasons.

In 2020, Gething played Ursula Pole in the second installment of the Starz historical drama The Spanish Princess. It was announced in 2021 that Gething had been cast as Anne Brontë in Frances O'Connor's biographical film Emily alongside Emma Mackey, Oliver Jackson-Cohen and Fionn Whitehead, directed by Frances O'Connor. The cast were jointly nominated for Best Ensemble Performance at the 2022 British Independent Film Awards.

In 2023, it was revealed Gething had voiced the player character in the video game Hogwarts Legacy. She has upcoming roles in the Apple TV+ war drama Masters of the Air and the Belgian series The Phoebus Files.

Filmography

References

External links 
 Amelia Gething's channel on YouTube
 

Living people
1999 births
20th-century English women
20th-century English people
21st-century English actresses
Actresses from Essex
Actresses from London
British TikTokers
British women television writers
Comedy YouTubers
English comedy writers
English film actresses
English television actresses
English television writers
English YouTubers
People from the London Borough of Redbridge